Melis Dilara Kaya (born 7 November 1991) is a Turkish professional basketball player of Galatasaray Medical Park.

Honors
Turkish Women's Basketball League
Runners-up (1): 2009–10
Turkish Cup
Winners (1): 2009–10
FIBA SuperCup
Runners-up (1): 2009

See also
 Turkish women in sports

External links
Profile at Galatasaray.org
Statistics at TBL.org.tr

1991 births
Living people
Basketball players from Istanbul
Turkish women's basketball players
Power forwards (basketball)
Galatasaray S.K. (women's basketball) players